is a Japanese boxer. He competed in the men's light welterweight event at the 1960 Summer Olympics. At the 1960 Summer Olympics in Rome, he lost to Piero Brandi of Italy in the Round of 32.

References

External links
 

1940 births
Living people
Japanese male boxers
Olympic boxers of Japan
Boxers at the 1960 Summer Olympics
Sportspeople from Fukushima Prefecture
Light-welterweight boxers